Norman G. Jesse (November 9, 1937 – May 28, 2000) was an American lawyer and politician from Des Moines, Iowa. A member of the Iowa Democratic Party, he served in the Iowa House of Representatives from 1969 to 1981. Jesse was gay; his partner for more than 35 years was Dan Johnston, who also served in the Iowa House. Neither Johnston nor Jesse was publicly out as gay during their careers in politics. They maintained separate residences across the street from each other and rarely spent the night together in the same bed.

Jesse attended Harriet B. Stowe Elementary School, Woodrow Wilson Junior High School and Des Moines Technical High School, graduating in January 1956. He received a B.S. degree from Iowa State University in 1961, majoring in industrial administration. He then went to Drake University Law School, where he earned an L.L.B. in 1964.

References

Democratic Party members of the Iowa House of Representatives
1937 births
2000 deaths
LGBT state legislators in Iowa
Gay politicians
Politicians from Des Moines, Iowa
Iowa State University alumni
20th-century American politicians
20th-century LGBT people
Drake University Law School alumni